Fomichevo is a rural locality (a village) in Bulgakovsky Selsoviet, Ufimsky District, Bashkortostan, Russia. The population was 234 as of 2010. There are 14 streets.

Geography 
Fomichevo is located 35 km southwest of Ufa (the district's administrative centre) by road. Yengalyshevo is the nearest rural locality.

References 

Rural localities in Ufimsky District